The 2021–22 season is Mansfield Town's 125th year in their history and ninth consecutive season in League Two. Along with the league, the club will also compete in the FA Cup, the EFL Cup and the EFL Trophy. The season covers the period from 1 July 2021 to 30 June 2022.

Squad statistics

Pre-season friendlies
The Stags announced they would play friendlies against Retford United, Matlock Town, Grimsby Town, Alfreton Town, Hull City, Coventry City, Basford United and Nottingham Forest U23s as part of the club's pre-season preparations.

Competitions

League Two

League table

Results summary

Results by matchday

Matches
Mansfield Town's fixtures were announced on 24 June 2021. On 7 July, the scheduled fixtures with Newport County were reversed due to renovation works at Rodney Parade.

Play-offs

FA Cup

Mansfield were drawn away to Sunderland in the first round, Doncaster Rovers in the second round and home to Middlesbrough in the third round.

EFL Cup

Mansfield were drawn at home to Preston North End in the first round.

EFL Trophy

Transfers

Transfers in

Loans in

Loans out

Transfers out

References

Mansfield Town
Mansfield Town F.C. seasons